Kingsbury High School, also known as Kingsbury Middle/High School, is a public high school in Memphis, Tennessee and a part of Shelby County Schools. It was previously in Memphis City Schools.

In 2018 the SCS administration suspended principal Terry Ross, accusing him of misconduct. Ross was previously principal of Bennett High School in Buffalo, New York.

References

External links
 Kingsbury High School
  - Memphis City Schools domain

Public high schools in Tennessee
Schools in Memphis, Tennessee